National Secondary Route 176, or just Route 176 (or ) is a National Road Route of Costa Rica, located in the San José province.

Description
In San José province the route covers San José canton (Hospital, Mata Redonda, Hatillo districts).

References

Highways in Costa Rica